Kristianstad Vattenrike Biosphere Reserve, a protected swamp area in the Hammarsjön Lake, surrounding the town of Kristianstad in Scania, southern Sweden. The point is at the bottom of what was once Nosabyviken, a bay on the lake of Hammarsjön. The bay was drained in the 1860s by John Nun Milner, an engineer, to get more arable land for Kristianstad.

Established in 2005, it provides habitat for a large number of endangered species of birds and fish. There are also deposits remaining from the Ice Age, the forests of Hanöbukten Bay and the rich wetlands of the River Helge.  The Kristianstad Vattenrike Biosphere Reserve is visited by about 100,000 people every year.

External links
 Vattenriket Official page, in Swedish and English.

Geography of Skåne County
Biosphere reserves of Sweden
Tourist attractions in Skåne County